Massimo Calearo Ciman (born 23 November 1955 in Vicenza) is an Italian entrepreneur and former politician from Veneto.
Chairman of Calearo Antenne spa, the family company producing antennas.
Before entering politics he held several leadership roles within Confindustria, at local and national level. Despite being a liberal-conservative, at the 2008 general election Calearo headed the list of the centre-left Democratic Party (PD) and was elected to the Italian Chamber of Deputies. However he soon found that the party was too left-wing for him and in November 2009 took part to the foundation of Alliance for Italy (ApI) with Francesco Rutelli.

After having launched Alliance for Veneto (ApV) in April 2010, in September Calearo left ApI in order to support Silvio Berlusconi's government.

References

Politicians of Veneto
1955 births
Living people
People from Vicenza
Democratic Party (Italy) politicians
21st-century Italian politicians
Members of the Chamber of Deputies (Italy)